Center Township is one of fifteen townships in Greene County, Indiana, USA.  As of the 2010 census, its population was 3,535.

Geography
The streams of Anderson Branch, Bridge Creek, Indian Creek and Little Clifty Branch run through this township.

Unincorporated towns
 Cincinnati
 Hobbieville
 Ridgeport
 Tanner
(This list is based on USGS data and may include former settlements.)

Adjacent townships
 Beech Creek Township (north)
 Van Buren Township, Monroe County (northeast)
 Indian Creek Township, Monroe County (east)
 Perry Township, Lawrence County (southeast)
 Jackson Township (south)
 Taylor Township (southwest)
 Richland Township (west)

Cemeteries
The township contains eight cemeteries: Beech, Bingham, Burch, Carmichael, Flynn, Lawrence, Sparks and Stone.

Major highways

References
 
 United States Census Bureau cartographic boundary files

External links
 Indiana Township Association
 United Township Association of Indiana

Townships in Greene County, Indiana
Bloomington metropolitan area, Indiana
Townships in Indiana